Emil Edvin Wide (22 February 1896 – 19 June 1996) was a Swedish middle-distance and long-distance runner.

Biography
Born in Finland as Emil Edvin Hermansson, Wide moved to Sweden in 1918. He competed for Sweden at the 1920 Summer Olympics in the 3000 metre team event, winning a bronze medal, together with Eric Backman and Sven Lundgren. At the 1924 Olympics he won a silver medal in the 10,000 m behind Ville Ritola of Finland. He also finished third in the 5,000 m, behind Ville Ritola and Paavo Nurmi.

At the 1928 Summer Olympics the 5,000 metre medals went to the same people as in 1924, only the Finns swapped medals, leaving Edvin with his third Olympic bronze medal. He then finished behind the same two yet again for the third time in Olympic competition to win the bronze medal in the 10,000 metres.

Nationally Wide won 12 Swedish titles: five in the cross country (1922–26), four in the 1,500 m and three in the 5,000 m, and held Swedish records over 1,500 m, 5,000 m and 10,000 m. He also held world records in non-Olympic 4 × 1500 m, 2000 m and 3000 m events, and won the United States two-mile indoor championships in 1929.

Wide lived most of hist life near Enköping, where he worked as a school teacher and then headmaster. In 1926 he was awarded the Svenska Dagbladet Gold Medal. He retired from competitions in 1930.

Wide died at the age of 100. He was survived by wife Axelina (age 99) and two sons.

References

1896 births
1996 deaths
People from Kimitoön
Athletes (track and field) at the 1920 Summer Olympics
Athletes (track and field) at the 1924 Summer Olympics
Athletes (track and field) at the 1928 Summer Olympics
Swedish male long-distance runners
Olympic athletes of Sweden
Olympic bronze medalists for Sweden
Olympic silver medalists for Sweden
Swedish centenarians
World record setters in athletics (track and field)
Medalists at the 1928 Summer Olympics
Medalists at the 1924 Summer Olympics
Medalists at the 1920 Summer Olympics
Olympic silver medalists in athletics (track and field)
Olympic bronze medalists in athletics (track and field)
Olympic cross country runners
Finnish emigrants to Sweden
Men centenarians